Aurum is the eight studio album by Polish gothic rock band Closterkeller. It was released on October 2, 2009 in Poland through Universal Music Polska. The album was recorded on June 23-September 10, 2009 at Izabelin Studio, Izabelin. The cover art was created by Albert Bonarski and fotos by Wojciech Wojtczak.

Track listing
All tracks by Anja Orthodox

Personnel
 Anja Orthodox - vocal
 Mariusz Kumala - guitar
 Krzysztof Najman - bass
 Janusz Jastrzębowski - drums
 Michał Rollinger - keyboards
Music - Closterkeller.

Release history

Charts

References

2009 albums
Closterkeller albums
Polish-language albums